Ward County is a county in the U.S. state of North Dakota. As of the 2020 census, the population was 69,919, making it the fourth-most populous county in North Dakota. Its county seat is Minot. Ward County is part of the Minot, ND Micropolitan Statistical Area.

History
The Dakota Territory legislature created the county on April 14, 1885, with areas partitioned from Renville, Stevens, and Wynn counties (Stevens and Wynn counties are now extinct). The county government was not organized at that date; the organization was effected on November 23 of that year. The county was named for Mark Ward, chairman of the House of Representatives Committee on Counties during the session. Burlington was the county seat; this was changed to Minot in 1888.

The boundaries of Ward County were altered two times in 1887, and in 1892, 1909 and 1910. The present county boundaries have been in place since 1910.

Until 1908, Ward County included what is now Burke, Mountrail, and Renville counties; this landmass often being referred to as 'Imperial Ward' County and which was the largest county in the state at the time. In 1908, voters took up measures to partition the county. The results for that portion forming Mountrail County were accepted but the results for the portions that would become Burke and Renville counties were disputed in court, which resulted in favorable rulings in 1910. When the proposed county lines for Burke and Renville counties were drawn, neither group wanted to include Kenmare and risk that city's becoming the county seat, so Kenmare was left in Ward County at the end of a narrow strip of land, commonly referred to as the 'gooseneck'. One of the options reportedly considered around this time was to create a fifth county, Lake, with Kenmare as its seat.

Geography
The Des Lacs River flows southeasterly through the northeast part of the county before doubling to the northeast on its journey to Lake Winnipeg. The county terrain consists of low rolling hills, dotted with ponds and lakes in its southern part, and carved by drainage gullies. The area is largely devoted to agriculture. The terrain slopes to the east and north, with its highest point near the southwest corner, at 2,175' (663m) ASL. It is the fifth-largest county in North Dakota by land area.

Major highways

  U.S. Highway 2
  U.S. Highway 52
  U.S. Highway 83
  North Dakota Highway 5
  North Dakota Highway 23
  North Dakota Highway 28
  North Dakota Highway 50

Adjacent counties

 Renville County - north
 McHenry County - east
 McLean County - south
 Mountrail County - west
 Burke County - northwest

Protected areas

 Des Lacs National Wildlife Refuge (part)
 Hiddenwood National Wildlife Refuge (part)
 National Wildfowl Production Areas
 Upper Souris National Wildlife Refuge (part)

Lakes

 Carpenter Lake
 Douglas Lake (part)
 Hiddenwood Lake (part)
 Makoti Lake
 Rice Lake
 Rush Lake

Demographics

2000 census
As of the 2000 census, there were 58,795 people, 23,041 households, and 15,368 families in the county. The population density was 29.2/sqmi (11.3/km2). There were 25,097 housing units at an average density of 12.5/sqmi (4.81/km2). The county is predominately White (92.40%), with African Americans and Native Americans making up 2.22% and 2.07% respectively. Asians and Pacific Islanders made up less than 1% of the population. Other races and those that identified as being two or more races made up 2.43%. 1.91% of the population were Hispanic or Latino of any race. 34.7% were of German ancestry and 27.9% Norwegian ancestry.

There were 23,041 households, out of which 34.30% had children under the age of 18 living with them, 55.20% were married couples living together, 8.40% had a female householder with no husband present, and 33.30% were non-families. 27.20% of all households were made up of individuals, and 9.80% had someone living alone who was 65 years of age or older.  The average household size was 2.46 and the average family size was 3.01.

The county population contained 26.20% under the age of 18, 13.00% from 18 to 24, 29.10% from 25 to 44, 19.20% from 45 to 64, and 12.50% who were 65 years of age or older. The median age was 32 years. For every 100 females there were 99.20 males. For every 100 females age 18 and over, there were 96.50 males.

The median income for a household in the county was $33,670, and the median income for a family was $41,342. Males had a median income of $27,980 versus $19,830 for females. The per capita income for the county was $16,926. About 7.90% of families and 10.80% of the population were below the poverty line, including 12.50% of those under age 18 and 8.40% of those age 65 or over.

2010 census
As of the 2010 census, there were 61,675 people, 25,029 households, and 15,597 families in the county. The population density was 30.6/sqmi (11.8/km2). There were 26,744 housing units at an average density of 13.3/sqmi (5.13/km2). The racial makeup of the county was 90.3% white, 2.6% American Indian, 2.5% black or African American, 0.9% Asian, 0.1% Pacific islander, 0.7% from other races, and 2.7% from two or more races. Those of Hispanic or Latino origin made up 3.0% of the population. In terms of ancestry, 44.4% were German, 30.8% were Norwegian, 11.6% were Irish, 5.7% were English, and 2.3% were American.

Of the 25,029 households, 30.6% had children under the age of 18 living with them, 49.9% were married couples living together, 8.4% had a female householder with no husband present, 37.7% were non-families, and 30.0% of all households were made up of individuals. The average household size was 2.36 and the average family size was 2.95. The median age was 32.7 years.

The median income for a household in the county was $48,793 and the median income for a family was $60,361. Males had a median income of $37,569 versus $28,415 for females. The per capita income for the county was $25,326. About 6.7% of families and 9.4% of the population were below the poverty line, including 13.0% of those under age 18 and 10.3% of those age 65 or over.

Communities

Cities

 Berthold
 Burlington
 Carpio
 Des Lacs
 Donnybrook
 Douglas
 Kenmare
 Makoti
 Minot (county seat)
 Ryder
 Sawyer
 Surrey

Census-designated places

 Foxholm
 Logan
 Minot AFB
 Ruthville

Unincorporated communities

 Aurelia - (ghost town)
 Drady
 Gassman -  founded when the Gassman Creek Coulee trestle was being built, now referred to as "Trestle Valley"
 Hartland - (ghost town)
 Hesnault
 Lonetree
 Rice Lake - community at Rice Lake near Minot
 South Prairie
 Wolseth

Historical areas

 Harrison - early community, now part of Minot
 Ralston - railroad siding
 Waldorf - early community, now part of Minot

Townships

 Afton
 Anna
 Baden
 Berthold
 Brillian
 Burlington
 Burt
 Cameron
 Carbondale
 Carpio
 Denmark
 Des Lacs
 Elmdale
 Eureka
 Evergreen
 Foxholm
 Freedom
 Gasman
 Greely
 Greenbush
 Harrison
 Hiddenwood
 Hilton
 Iota Flat
 Kenmare
 Kirkelie
 Linton
 Lund
 Mandan
 Margaret
 Maryland
 Mayland
 McKinley
 Nedrose
 New Prairie
 Newman
 Orlien
 Passport
 Ree
 Rice Lake
 Rolling Green
 Rushville
 Ryder
 St. Marys
 Sauk Prairie
 Sawyer
 Shealy
 Spencer
 Spring Lake
 Sundre
 Surrey
 Tatman
 Tolgen
 Torning
 Vang
 Waterford
 Willis

Politics
Ward County voters are traditionally and increasingly Republican. In only one national election since 1944 (1964) has the county selected the Democratic Party candidate. In 2020, Donald Trump received 70.7% of the vote in this county, the highest for any candidate since Theodore Roosevelt, although his margin relative to his Democratic opponent declined from 2016, most likely due to the high number of third party votes from the 2016 election cycle in Ward County.

See also
 National Register of Historic Places listings in Ward County, North Dakota

References

External links
 Ward County official website
 Ward County Historical Society website
 Ward County maps, Sheet 1 (northwest), Sheet 2 (northeast), and Sheet 3 (southern), North Dakota DOT

 
1885 establishments in Dakota Territory
Populated places established in 1885